ʙ̩The following is a list of churches in South Hams, Devon, England.

Active churches 
The district has an estimated 102 active churches for 84,300 inhabitants, a ratio of one church to every 826 people.

The only parish without an active church is West Buckfastleigh.

Defunct churches

References

South Hams
 
Churches
Lists of buildings and structures in Devon